Mbour Sign Language is an indigenous sign language used in a neighborhood of the city of M'Bour in Senegal. Deaf people in the neighborhood meet regularly.

References
Jirou, G. (n.d.) Description d’une langue des signes informelle en dehors du milieu institutionnel: Analyse lexicale du parler gestuel de Mbour (Sénégal). DEA thesis.

Sign language isolates
Languages of Senegal